Rugenio Josephia (born 1 December 1989) is a Curaçao international footballer who plays for SV Atlétiko Flamingo, as a goalkeeper.

Career
Josephia has played club football for SV Juventus and TSV NOAD.

He made his international debut for Curaçao in 2011.

References

1989 births
Living people
Curaçao footballers
Curaçao international footballers
Bonaire footballers
Bonaire international footballers
Association football goalkeepers
2014 Caribbean Cup players
SV Juventus players
Dual internationalists (football)